= Sofyank =

Malaysian social media personality

- Born: Muhammad Sofian bin Abdullah; 30 November 1996 (age 29); Kota Bharu, Kelantan
- Occupations: Digital content creator, special effects video editor
- Spouse: Nabilah Ramli (m. 2022)
- Children: 1

Instagram information
- Page: sofyank96
- Followers: 1.1 million

TikTok information
- Page: sofyank96
- Followers: 3.2 million (February 2, 2025)

Muhammad Sofian Abdullah (born 30 November 1996) better known as Sofyank, is a Malaysian social media personality and digital content creator. He is known for producing edited videos with special effects.

Sofyank was listed as one of the top 5 influencers in the Anugerah MeleTOP Era 2020 for the category Influencer Meletop Syok.
